Jefferson Township may refer to:

Arkansas 

 Jefferson Township, Boone County, Arkansas
 Jefferson Township, Desha County, Arkansas, in Desha County, Arkansas
 Jefferson Township, Independence County, Arkansas, in Independence County, Arkansas
 Jefferson Township, Izard County, Arkansas, in Izard County, Arkansas
 Jefferson Township, Jackson County, Arkansas, in Jackson County, Arkansas
 Jefferson Township, Jefferson County, Arkansas, in Jefferson County, Arkansas
 Jefferson Township, Little River County, Arkansas, in Little River County, Arkansas
 Jefferson Township, Newton County, Arkansas, in Newton County, Arkansas
 Jefferson Township, Ouachita County, Arkansas, in Ouachita County, Arkansas
 Jefferson Township, Saline County, Arkansas, in Saline County, Arkansas
 Jefferson Township, Sevier County, Arkansas, in Sevier County, Arkansas
 Jefferson Township, White County, Arkansas, in White County, Arkansas

Illinois 
 Jefferson Township, Cook County, Illinois

Indiana 
 Jefferson Township, Adams County, Indiana
 Jefferson Township, Allen County, Indiana
 Jefferson Township, Boone County, Indiana
 Jefferson Township, Carroll County, Indiana
 Jefferson Township, Cass County, Indiana
 Jefferson Township, Dubois County, Indiana
 Jefferson Township, Elkhart County, Indiana
 Jefferson Township, Grant County, Indiana
 Jefferson Township, Greene County, Indiana
 Jefferson Township, Henry County, Indiana
 Jefferson Township, Huntington County, Indiana
 Jefferson Township, Jay County, Indiana
 Jefferson Township, Kosciusko County, Indiana
 Jefferson Township, Miami County, Indiana
 Jefferson Township, Morgan County, Indiana
 Jefferson Township, Newton County, Indiana
 Jefferson Township, Noble County, Indiana
 Jefferson Township, Owen County, Indiana
 Jefferson Township, Pike County, Indiana
 Jefferson Township, Pulaski County, Indiana
 Jefferson Township, Putnam County, Indiana
 Jefferson Township, Sullivan County, Indiana
 Jefferson Township, Switzerland County, Indiana
 Jefferson Township, Tipton County, Indiana
 Jefferson Township, Washington County, Indiana
 Jefferson Township, Wayne County, Indiana
 Jefferson Township, Wells County, Indiana
 Jefferson Township, Whitley County, Indiana

Iowa 
 Jefferson Township, Adair County, Iowa
 Jefferson Township, Allamakee County, Iowa
 Jefferson Township, Bremer County, Iowa
 Jefferson Township, Buchanan County, Iowa
 Jefferson Township, Butler County, Iowa
 Jefferson Township, Clayton County, Iowa
 Jefferson Township, Dubuque County, Iowa, in Dubuque County, Iowa
 Jefferson Township, Fayette County, Iowa
 Jefferson Township, Harrison County, Iowa
 Jefferson Township, Henry County, Iowa
 Jefferson Township, Johnson County, Iowa
 Jefferson Township, Lee County, Iowa
 Jefferson Township, Louisa County, Iowa
 Jefferson Township, Madison County, Iowa
 Jefferson Township, Mahaska County, Iowa
 Jefferson Township, Marshall County, Iowa
 Jefferson Township, Polk County, Iowa
 Jefferson Township, Poweshiek County, Iowa
 Jefferson Township, Ringgold County, Iowa
 Jefferson Township, Shelby County, Iowa, in Shelby County, Iowa
 Jefferson Township, Taylor County, Iowa
 Jefferson Township, Warren County, Iowa, in Warren County, Iowa
 Jefferson Township, Wayne County, Iowa

Kansas 
 Jefferson Township, Chautauqua County, Kansas
 Jefferson Township, Dickinson County, Kansas
 Jefferson Township, Geary County, Kansas
 Jefferson Township, Jackson County, Kansas
 Jefferson Township, Jefferson County, Kansas
 Jefferson Township, Rawlins County, Kansas, in Rawlins County, Kansas
 Jefferson Township, Republic County, Kansas

Michigan 
 Jefferson Township, Cass County, Michigan
 Jefferson Township, Hillsdale County, Michigan

Minnesota 
 Jefferson Township, Houston County, Minnesota

Missouri 
 Jefferson Township, Andrew County, Missouri
 Jefferson Township, Cedar County, Missouri
 Jefferson Township, Clark County, Missouri
 Jefferson Township, Cole County, Missouri
 Jefferson Township, Daviess County, Missouri
 Jefferson Township, Grundy County, Missouri
 Jefferson Township, Harrison County, Missouri
 Jefferson Township, Johnson County, Missouri
 Jefferson Township, Linn County, Missouri
 Jefferson Township, Maries County, Missouri
 Jefferson Township, Monroe County, Missouri
 Jefferson Township, Nodaway County, Missouri
 Jefferson Township, Osage County, Missouri
 Jefferson Township, Polk County, Missouri
 Jefferson Township, Scotland County, Missouri
 Jefferson Township, Shelby County, Missouri
 Jefferson Township, St. Louis County, Missouri, in St. Louis County, Missouri
 Jefferson Township, Wayne County, Missouri

Nebraska 
 Jefferson Township, Knox County, Nebraska

New Jersey 
 Jefferson Township, New Jersey

North Carolina 
 Jefferson Township, Ashe County, North Carolina
 Jefferson Township, Guilford County, North Carolina, in Guilford County, North Carolina

North Dakota 
 Jefferson Township, Pierce County, North Dakota, in Pierce County, North Dakota

Ohio 
 Jefferson Township, Adams County, Ohio
 Jefferson Township, Ashtabula County, Ohio
 Jefferson Township, Brown County, Ohio
 Jefferson Township, Clinton County, Ohio
 Jefferson Township, Coshocton County, Ohio
 Jefferson Township, Crawford County, Ohio
 Jefferson Township, Fayette County, Ohio
 Jefferson Township, Franklin County, Ohio
 Jefferson Township, Greene County, Ohio
 Jefferson Township, Guernsey County, Ohio
 Jefferson Township, Jackson County, Ohio
 Jefferson Township, Knox County, Ohio
 Jefferson Township, Logan County, Ohio
 Jefferson Township, Madison County, Ohio
 Jefferson Township, Mercer County, Ohio
 Jefferson Township, Montgomery County, Ohio
 Jefferson Township, Muskingum County, Ohio
 Jefferson Township, Noble County, Ohio
 Jefferson Township, Preble County, Ohio
 Jefferson Township, Richland County, Ohio
 Jefferson Township, Ross County, Ohio
 Jefferson Township, Scioto County, Ohio
 Jefferson Township, Tuscarawas County, Ohio
 Jefferson Township, Williams County, Ohio

Pennsylvania 
 Jefferson Township, Berks County, Pennsylvania
 Jefferson Township, Butler County, Pennsylvania
 Jefferson Township, Dauphin County, Pennsylvania
 Jefferson Township, Fayette County, Pennsylvania
 Jefferson Township, Greene County, Pennsylvania
 Jefferson Township, Lackawanna County, Pennsylvania
 Jefferson Township, Mercer County, Pennsylvania
 Jefferson Township, Somerset County, Pennsylvania
 Jefferson Township, Washington County, Pennsylvania

South Dakota 
 Jefferson Township, McCook County, South Dakota, in McCook County, South Dakota
 Jefferson Township, Moody County, South Dakota, in Moody County, South Dakota
 Jefferson Township, Spink County, South Dakota, in Spink County, South Dakota
 Jefferson Township, Union County, South Dakota, in Union County, South Dakota

Township name disambiguation pages